The following lists events that happened during 1821 in Chile.

Incumbents
Supreme Director of Chile: Bernardo O'Higgins

Events

October
6 October - Cochrane sails to California.
9-10 October - Battle of las Vegas de Saldías

December
9 December - The Cementerio General de Santiago is established.

Births
date unknown - Cornelio Saavedra Rodríguez (d. 1891)

Deaths
4 September - José Miguel Carrera (b. 1785)
29 October - José Antonio Errázuriz (b. 1747)

References 

 
1820s in Chile
Chile
Chile